Grijalva River, formerly known as Tabasco River, (known locally also as Río Grande de Chiapas, Río Grande and Mezcalapa River) is a  long river in southeastern Mexico. It is named after Juan de Grijalva who visited the area in 1518.

The river rises from Río Grande de Chiapas in southeastern Chiapas and flows from Chiapas to the state of Tabasco through the Sumidero Canyon into the Bay of Campeche. Begins as "Río Grande de Chiapas" or "Río Mezcalapa", later, Río Grande is stopped at the Angostura Dam (Mexico), one of the largest reservoirs in Mexico, and then its course is now named "Grijalva River". Because of the close connection to the Usumacinta River (the two combine, flowing into the Gulf of Mexico in a single delta), they are often regarded as a single river basin, the Grijalva-Usumacinta River. Río Grande de Chiapas rises into Sierra de los Cuchumatanes, Guatemala; in Guatemala receives the name "Selegua River" and also is a large river.

After flowing from Nezahualcoyotl Lake, an artificial lake created by the hydroelectric Malpaso Dam, Grijalva River turns northward and eastward, roughly paralleling the Chiapas-Tabasco state border.

Gallery

See also
Chiapas bridge
List of longest rivers of Mexico

References

Rivers of Chiapas
Rivers of Tabasco
 
Petén–Veracruz moist forests